|}

The Bet365 Gold Cup is a Grade 3 National Hunt steeplechase in Great Britain which is open to horses aged five years or older. It is run at Sandown Park over a distance of about 3 miles and 5 furlongs (3 miles, 4 furlongs and 166 yards, or ), and during its running there are twenty-four fences to be jumped. It is a handicap race, and it is scheduled to take place each year in late April.

History
The event was established in 1957, and it was originally called the Whitbread Gold Cup. It was sponsored by Whitbread Brewers at the instigation of Colonel Bill Whitbread, the company's chairman, who had twice ridden in the Grand National as an amateur jockey. It was the first commercial sponsorship in British sport, and the longest-running until it ended in 2001.

In recent years the race has been sponsored by At the Races (2002–03), Betfred (2004–07) and Bet365 (2008–). The record for the longest-running sponsorship of a British horse race is now held by the Hennessy Gold Cup, which was launched seven months after the "Whitbread" and was sponsored by Hennessy until the 2016 running.

The Bet365 Gold Cup takes place at a meeting which features both jump and flat races and marks the end of the National Hunt racing season in Great Britain. Other events at this meeting include the Celebration Chase, the Gordon Richards Stakes and the Sandown Mile.

Records
Most successful horse (2 wins):
 Larbawn – 1968, 1969
 Diamond Edge – 1979, 1981
 Topsham Bay – 1992, 1993
 Ad Hoc – 2001, 2003

Leading jockey (3 wins):
 Ron Barry – Titus Oates (1971), Charlie Potheen (1973), The Dikler (1974)

Leading trainer (7 wins):
 Fulke Walwyn – Taxidermist (1958), Mill House (1967), Charlie Potheen (1973), The Dikler (1974), Diamond Edge (1979, 1981), Special Cargo (1984)

Winners
 Weights given in stones and pounds.

See also
 Horse racing in Great Britain
 List of British National Hunt races
 Recurring sporting events established in 1957  – this race is included under its original title, Whitbread Gold Cup.

External links
 Race Recordings1967 Whitbread Gold Cup Handicap Chase

References

 Racing Post:

 pedigreequery.com – Gold Cup Handicap Chase – Sandown.
 

National Hunt races in Great Britain
Sandown Park Racecourse
National Hunt chases
1957 establishments in England